Smirnykh is an urban locality (an urban-type settlement) and the administrative center of Smirnykhovsky District of Sakhalin Oblast, Russia, located in the central part of the Sakhalin Island. Population:

History
During fighting between Soviet and Japanese forces on the island during World War II, Battalion Commander Leonid Smirnykh and Sergeant Anton Buyukly were killed; the localities of Smyrnikh, Leonidovo, and Buyukly are named in their honor.

Administrative and municipal status
Within the framework of administrative divisions, Smirnykh serves as the administrative center of Smirnykhovsky District and is subordinated to it. As a municipal division, the urban-type settlement of Smirnykh and thirteen rural localities of Smirnykhovsky District are incorporated as Smirnykhovsky Urban Okrug.

Military
It was home to Smirnykh air base during the Cold War.

References

Notes

Sources

External links

Urban-type settlements in Sakhalin Oblast